Vitex cooperi is a species of plant in the family Lamiaceae. It is found in Costa Rica, Guatemala, Honduras, Nicaragua, and Panama.

References

cooperi
Endangered plants
Taxonomy articles created by Polbot